Dharwad railway station formerly known as Dharwar railway station  (station code: DWR) is a major station under Hubli railway division of South Western Railway zone of Indian Railways situated in Dharwad constructed in the year of 1924, Karnataka. It is in top 10 station in South Western Railway (SWR). It is one of the busiest railway station in the state.

Services 

Dharwad is well connected to Hubballi, Belgaum, Bangalore, Mumbai, Pune, Gadag, Bagalkot, Bijapur, Solapur, Bellary, Davangere, Delhi, Visakhapatnam, Hyderabad, Ahmedabad, Vijayawada, Mysore, Tirupati and Manmad by daily trains to Chennai, Howrah and Thiruvananthapuram.

Line 
Dharwad railway station is part of Guntakal–Vasco da Gama section HDN-7A Doubling

See also 
 Hubli Junction railway station
 Hubli Airport
 Hubli-Dharwad Bus Rapid Transit System

References

External links
 
 

Hubli railway division
Railway stations in Dharwad district
Transport in Hubli-Dharwad
Rail transport in Dharwad
Buildings and structures in Dharwad
Buildings and structures in Hubli-Dharwad